Dan Bramall (born 3 September 1998) is an English professional footballer who plays for Scarborough Athletic, as a winger.

Career
Born in Chesterfield, Bramall played youth football for Chesterfield and Everton, and non-league football for Matlock Town and Buxton. He signed for Barnsley in September 2020, moving on loan to Barrow in January 2021. He was released by Barnsley at the end of the season.

He signed for Ballymena United in August 2021. In August 2022 he moved to Scarborough Athletic.

Career statistics

References

1998 births
Living people
English footballers
Chesterfield F.C. players
Everton F.C. players
Matlock Town F.C. players
Buxton F.C. players
Barnsley F.C. players
Barrow A.F.C. players
Ballymena United F.C. players
Scarborough Athletic F.C. players
Northern Premier League players
English Football League players
Association football wingers
NIFL Premiership players